BBT may refer to:

Arts and entertainment
 The Big Bang Theory, an American sitcom
 "The Big Bang Theory" (Family Guy), an episode of Family Guy
 Big Biz Tycoon, a business simulation game by Animedia

 Bujinkan Budō Taijutsu, the group which teaches the Bujinkan
 Black box theater, a simple performance space, typically a square room with black walls and a flat floor.

Music
 Big Bang Theory (Harem Scarem album), a 1998 album by the Canadian hard rock band Harem Scarem
 Big Bang Theory (Styx album), an album by Styx
 Big Big Train, an English progressive rock band that was founded in 1990

Organisations
 Air Bashkortostan (ICAO code BBT), an airline based in Russia
 Barbier, Benard, et Turenne, a French company that specialized in the manufacture of lighthouse lenses
 Bhaktivedanta Book Trust, the world's largest publisher of books concerning Krishna
 Barclays Bank Tanzania, a commercial bank in Tanzania
 Toyama Television, a television station in Japan
 Brighton Ballet Theater, a not-for-profit professional dance school

Transport
 BBT, the Indian Railways station code for Birati railway station, West Bengal, India
 BBT, the MRT station abbreviation for Bukit Batok MRT station, Singapore

Other uses
 Basal body temperature, the lowest temperature attained by the body during rest
 Bubble tea, a Taiwanese beverage usually containing a tea base mixed with fruit (or fruit syrup) and/or milk
 Brenner Base Tunnel, a planned long railway tunnel through the base of the Brenner massif

See also
 Big Bang (Big Bang theory), the prevailing cosmological model for the universe
 Big Bang (disambiguation)
 Big Bang Theory (disambiguation)